A mailman is a person who delivers mail.

Mailman may also refer to:

Arts 
The Mailman (1923 film), an American silent drama film
The Mailman (2004 film), a psychological thriller film
Mailman (novel), a 2003 novel by American author J. Robert Lennon
The Mailman (novel), a 1991 novel by Bentley Little

Music 
The Mail Man, a 1993 album by American rapper E-40
"Mailman", a song by Soundgarden from Superunknown

People 
Bruce Mailman (1939–1994), American theatre owner
Deborah Mailman (born 1972), Australian actress
Erika Mailman, American writer and journalist
Joseph Mailman, American philanthropist 
Martin Mailman (1932–2000), American composer
Stetson Bennett (born 1997), American football player nicknamed "the Mailman"
Karl Malone (born 1963), American basketball player nicknamed "the Mailman"

Other uses 
GNU Mailman, mailing list software
Mailman Group, a Chinese media company